An Evening Without Monty Python is a stage show produced by WestBeth Entertainment and directed by Eric Idle and BT McNicholl in celebration of the comedy troupe Monty Python's 40th anniversary, featuring sketches and songs from the show hand-picked by Idle.

The show debuted at the Ricardo Montalbán Theatre in Los Angeles and played from 23 September to 4 October 2009. It then moved to New York City, where it played at The Town Hall from 6 to 10 October 2009.

Cast 
 Jeff B. Davis
 Jane Leeves
 Alan Tudyk
 Rick Holmes
 Sarah Moon
 Joe DeNicholas
 Jim Piddock

Hank Azaria, who had originated the role of Lancelot in Idle's previous Monty Python-related stage show Spamalot, was announced as part of the cast but was forced to withdraw prior to opening in Los Angeles due to a film commitment. He was replaced by Jeff B. Davis.

References

External links 

Monty Python
Comedy plays
Plays based on television series
2009 in theatre